Double Negative is a piece of land art located in the Moapa Valley on Mormon Mesa (or Virgin River Mesa) near Overton, Nevada. Double Negative was created in 1969 by artist Michael Heizer, and consists of a trench dug into the earth.

Description

Two trenches straddle either side of a natural canyon (into which the excavated material was dumped). The "negative" in the title thus refers in part to both the natural and man-made negative space that constitutes the work. The work essentially consists of what is not there, what has been displaced.

Double Negative can be reached by following Mormon Mesa Road north-eastward from Overton to the top of the mesa, continuing across it for 2.7 miles, turning left at the opposite edge onto a smaller path that extends along the rim of the mesa, and then following the path north for 1.3 miles.

History
In 1969 the art dealer Virginia Dwan funded the purchase of the 60-acre site for Double Negative and in turn, the artist transferred the property deeds to Dwan. In 1971 Heizer prevented the Dwan Gallery from selling the work. Dwan then donated Double Negative to the Museum of Contemporary Art, Los Angeles (MoCA) in 1984, with Heizer’s blessing, to coincide with “In Context: Michael Heizer, Geometric Extraction”. Among the terms of the agreement with the museum is the fact that, according to the artist's wishes, MoCA will undertake no conservation of the piece as Heizer indicated that nature should eventually reclaim the land through weather and erosion. Recently however he has expressed a contrasting wish to restore the piece, perhaps in opposition to Robert Smithson's support for the principle of entropy.

For the solo exhibition "In Context: Michael Heizer, Geometric Extraction", MoCA was able to include a photographic panorama of Heizer’s work. For the large-scale, historical survey of land art “Ends of the Earth” at MoCA in 2012, Heizer did not want any representation of Double Negative to be included in the exhibition. A good aerial photograph appears in the catalogue, but Heizer reportedly worried that documentation in a museum gallery would misrepresent a sculpture that he felt could be known only through physical experience.

In 2021, plans for a solar development project near Double Negative were rejected due to resident protests against the project's impact on the artwork. The work is currently owned by MoCA and is accessible by four-wheel drive vehicle or motorcycle.

References

External links
 
 A Las Vegas Sun story and panorama about the work
 Double Negative on Youtube
 double negative: a webpage about michael heizer (includes description and driving directions)

Land art
1970 sculptures
Outdoor sculptures in Nevada
Buildings and structures in Clark County, Nevada